Crystal Shawanda (born July 26, 1983) is a Canadian blues and country music artist. CMT documented her rise to fame in the six-part series Crystal: Living the Dream, which was broadcast in February 2008. Signed to RCA Nashville in 2007, she released her first single, "You Can Let Go", in Canada in January 2008. It was the fastest climbing single on the Canadian Country Singles Chart since Carolyn Dawn Johnson's "Georgia" in 2000, reaching the Top 10 in five weeks. It was released in the United States on February 25, 2008 .

Life 
Shawanda was born in Wiikwemkoong First Nation, Manitoulin Island, Ontario.  She spent her youth in Sault Ste. Marie, Ontario, where she attended Korah Collegiate. Her surname translates to "Dawn of a New Day".

Many of Shawanda's songs have been inspired by her connections to Wiikwemkoong and part of her 2016 album was recorded at the Debajehmujig Creation Centre in Manitowaning, Manitoulin Island.

Music career
Shawanda's first album, Dawn of a New Day, was released in Canada on June 24, 2008, and in the United States on August 19. The album entered the Canadian Country Albums chart at number 2, and the Billboard Top Country Albums chart at number 16. It became the highest charted album by a full-blooded Canadian First Nations country artist in the SoundScan era.

Shawanda toured with various artists across Canada and the northern United States in 2008. In 2009, she toured Canada and the United States with Brad Paisley and Dierks Bentley as a special guest on the Paisley Party 2009 tour. Her first single, "You Can Let Go", peaked at number 21 on the Hot Country Songs charts. In mid-2009, Shawanda left RCA Nashville and, through her own record label, New Sun Records, and a distribution deal with EMI/On Ramp Records, released a Christmas album titled I'll Be Home for Christmas.

In 2010, Shawanda released a single, "Beautiful Day", via her own label, New Sun Records. Shawanda also performed at the Macy's Thanksgiving Day Parade in 2010, performing "Let's Come Together" and "This Is My Land". She then released another single, "Love Enough", on August 15, 2011 in both Canada and the United States. Shawanda's second studio album, Just Like You, was released by New Sun on April 24, 2012.

Discography

Studio albums

Singles

Notes

a^ "You Can Let Go" also reached number nine on the Bubbling Under Hot 100 Singles chart.

As a featured artist

Music videos

Awards and nominations

References

External links

 Crystal Shawanda

Living people
1983 births
21st-century First Nations people
21st-century Canadian women singers
Canadian Country Music Association Female Artist of the Year winners
Canadian country singer-songwriters
Canadian women country singers
First Nations musicians
Juno Award for Indigenous Music Album of the Year winners
Musicians from Ontario
Ojibwe people
People from Manitoulin Island
RCA Records Nashville artists
Canadian blues singers
Juno Award for Blues Album of the Year winners
First Nations women